Yenidoğdu, formerly Sorpiyan, is a village in the Hozat District, Tunceli Province, Turkey. The village is populated by Kurds of the Ferhadan tribe and had a population of 156 in 2021.

The hamlets of Arpalı, Çalıkuşu, İncecik, Kuruovacık are attached to the village.

References 

Kurdish settlements in Tunceli Province
Villages in Hozat District